Centruroides pallidiceps is a species of scorpion in the family Buthidae. It is native to Mexico.

References

Buthidae
Centruroides
Endemic scorpions of Mexico
Animals described in 1902